José Pérez Llácer (26 January 1927 – 16 July 2006) was a Spanish racing cyclist. He rode in the 1952 Tour de France.

References

External links
 

1927 births
2006 deaths
Spanish male cyclists
Place of birth missing
People from Horta Sud
Sportspeople from the Province of Valencia
Cyclists from the Valencian Community